Gary Cooper (born Frank James Cooper; May 7, 1901May 13, 1961) was an American actor known for his strong, quiet screen persona and understated acting style. He won the Academy Award for Best Actor twice and had a further three nominations, as well as an Academy Honorary Award in 1961 for his career achievements. He was one of the top-10 film personalities for 23 consecutive years and one of the top money-making stars for 18 years. The American Film Institute (AFI) ranked Cooper at number11 on its list of the 25 greatest male stars of classic Hollywood cinema.

Cooper's career spanned 36 years, from 1925 to 1961, and included leading roles in 84 feature films. He was a major movie star from the end of the silent film era through to the end of the golden age of classical Hollywood. His screen persona appealed strongly to both men and women, and his range included roles in most major film genres. His ability to project his own personality onto the characters he played contributed to his natural and authentic appearance on screen. Throughout his career, he sustained a screen persona that represented the ideal American hero.

Cooper began his career as a film extra and stunt rider, but soon landed acting roles. After establishing himself as a Western hero in his early silent films, he appeared as the Virginian and became a movie star in 1929 with his first sound picture, The Virginian. In the early 1930s, he expanded his heroic image to include more cautious characters in adventure films and dramas such as A Farewell to Arms (1932) and The Lives of a Bengal Lancer (1935). During the height of his career, Cooper portrayed a new type of hero, a champion of the common man in films such as Mr. Deeds Goes to Town (1936), Meet John Doe (1941), Sergeant York (1941), The Pride of the Yankees (1942), and For Whom the Bell Tolls (1943). He later portrayed more mature characters at odds with the world in films such as The Fountainhead (1949) and High Noon (1952). In his final films, he played nonviolent characters searching for redemption in films such as Friendly Persuasion (1956) and Man of the West (1958).

Early life

Frank James Cooper was born in Helena, Montana, on May 7, 1901, the younger of two sons of English parents Alice (née Brazier; 1873–1967) and Charles Henry Cooper (1865–1946). His brother, Arthur, was six years his senior. Cooper's father came from Houghton Regis, Bedfordshire, and became a prominent lawyer, rancher, and Montana Supreme Court justice. His mother hailed from Gillingham, Kent, and married Charles in Montana. Cooper and Arthur spent their summers at the ranch and learned to ride horses, hunt, and fish. Cooper attended Central Grade School in Helena.

Alice wanted her sons to have an English education, so she took them back to England in 1909 to enroll them in Dunstable Grammar School in Dunstable, Bedfordshire. While there, Cooper and his brother lived with their father's cousins, William and Emily Barton, at their home in Houghton Regis. Cooper studied Latin, French, and English history at Dunstable until 1912. While he adapted to English school discipline and learned the requisite social graces, he never adjusted to the rigid class structure and the formal Eton collars he was required to wear. He received his confirmation in the Church of England at the Church of All Saints in Houghton Regis on December 3, 1911. His mother accompanied her sons back to the U.S. in August 1912, and Cooper resumed his education at Johnson Grammar School in Helena.

When Cooper was 15, he injured his hip in a car accident. On his doctor's recommendation, he returned to the Seven-Bar-Nine ranch to recuperate by horseback riding. The misguided therapy left him with his characteristic stiff, off-balanced walk and slightly angled horse-riding style. He left Helena High School after two years in 1918 and returned to the family ranch to work full-time as a cowboy. In 1919, his father arranged for him to attend Gallatin County High School in Bozeman, Montana, where English teacher Ida Davis encouraged him to focus on academics and participate in debating and dramatics. Cooper later called Davis "the woman partly responsible for [his] giving up cowboy-ing and going to college".

Cooper was still attending high school in 1920, when he took three art courses at Montana Agricultural College in Bozeman. His interest in art was inspired years earlier by the Western paintings of Charles Marion Russell and Frederic Remington. Cooper especially admired and studied Russell's Lewis and Clark Meeting Indians at Ross' Hole (1910), which still hangs in the state capitol building in Helena. 

In 1922, to continue his art education, Cooper enrolled in Grinnell College, Grinnell, Iowa. He did well academically in most of his courses, but was not accepted into the school's drama club. His drawings and watercolor paintings were exhibited throughout the dormitory, and he was named art editor for the college yearbook. During the summers of 1922 and 1923, Cooper worked at Yellowstone National Park as a tour guide driving the yellow open-top buses. Despite a promising first 18 months at Grinnell, he left college suddenly in February 1924, spent a month in Chicago looking for work as an artist, and then returned to Helena, where he sold editorial cartoons to the local Independent newspaper.

In autumn 1924, Cooper's father left the Montana Supreme Court bench and moved with his wife to Los Angeles to administer the estates of two relatives, and Cooper joined his parents there in November at his father's request. After briefly working a series of unpromising jobs, he met two friends from Montana, who were working as film extras and stunt riders in low-budget Western films for the small movie studios on Poverty Row. They introduced him to another Montana cowboy, rodeo champion Jay "Slim" Talbot, who took him to see a casting director. Wanting money for a professional art course, Cooper worked as a film extra for $5 a day, and as a stunt rider for $10. Cooper and Talbot became close friends and hunting companions, and Talbot later worked as Cooper's stuntman and stand-in for over three decades.

Career

Silent films, 1925–1928

In early 1925, Cooper began his film career in silent pictures such as The Thundering Herd and Wild Horse Mesa with Jack Holt, Riders of the Purple Sage and The Lucky Horseshoe with Tom Mix, and The Trail Rider with Buck Jones. He worked for several Poverty Row studios, but also the already emergent major studios, Famous Players-Lasky and Fox Film Corporation. While his skilled horsemanship led to steady work in Westerns, Cooper found the stunt work, which sometimes injured horses and riders, "tough and cruel". Hoping to move beyond the risky stunt work and obtain acting roles, Cooper paid for a screen test and hired casting director Nan Collins to work as his agent. Knowing that other actors were using the name "Frank Cooper", Collins suggested he change his first name to "Gary" after her hometown of Gary, Indiana. Cooper immediately liked the name.

Cooper also found work in a variety of non-Western films, appearing, for example, as a masked Cossack in The Eagle (1925), as a Roman guard in Ben-Hur (1925), and as a flood survivor in The Johnstown Flood (1926). Gradually, he began to land credited roles that offered him more screen time, in films such as Tricks (1925), in which he played the film's antagonist, and the short film Lightnin' Wins (1926). As a featured player, he began to attract the attention of major film studios. On June 1, 1926, Cooper signed a contract with Samuel Goldwyn Productions for $50 a week.

Cooper's first important film role was a supporting part in The Winning of Barbara Worth (1926) starring Ronald Colman and Vilma Bánky, in which he plays a young engineer who helps a rival suitor save the woman he loves and her town from an impending dam disaster. Cooper's experience living among the Montana cowboys gave his performance an "instinctive authenticity", according to biographer Jeffrey Meyers. The film was a major success. Critics singled out Cooper as a "dynamic new personality" and future star. Goldwyn rushed to offer Cooper a long-term contract, but he held out for a better deal - a five-year contract with Jesse L. Lasky at Paramount Pictures for $175 a week. In 1927, with help from Clara Bow, Cooper landed high-profile roles in Children of Divorce and Wings (both 1927), the latter being the first film to win an Academy Award for Best Picture. That year, Cooper also appeared in his first starring roles in Arizona Bound and Nevada, both films directed by John Waters.

Paramount paired Cooper with Fay Wray in The Legion of the Condemned and The First Kiss (both 1928), advertising them as the studio's "glorious young lovers". Their on-screen chemistry failed to generate much excitement with audiences. With each new film, Cooper's acting skills improved and his popularity continued to grow, especially among female movie-goers. During this time, he was earning as much as $2,750 per film and receiving 1,000 fan letters a week. Looking to exploit Cooper's growing audience appeal, the studio placed him opposite popular leading ladies such as Evelyn Brent in Beau Sabreur, Florence Vidor in Doomsday, and Esther Ralston in Half a Bride (all 1928). Around the same time, Cooper made Lilac Time (1928) with Colleen Moore for First National Pictures, his first movie with synchronized music and sound effects. It became one of the most commercially successful films of 1928.

Hollywood stardom, 1929–1935

Cooper became a major movie star in 1929 with the release of his first talking picture, The Virginian (1929), which was directed by Victor Fleming and co-starred Mary Brian and Walter Huston. Based on the popular novel by Owen Wister, The Virginian was one of the first sound films to define the Western code of honor and helped establish many of the conventions of the Western movie genre that persist to the present day. According to biographer Jeffrey Meyers, the romantic image of the tall, handsome, and shy cowboy hero who embodied male freedom, courage, and honor was created in large part by Cooper in the film. Unlike some silent-film actors who had trouble adapting to the new sound medium, Cooper transitioned naturally, with his "deep and clear" and "pleasantly drawling" voice, which was perfectly suited for the characters he portrayed on screen, also according to Meyers. Looking to capitalize on Cooper's growing popularity, Paramount cast him in several Westerns and wartime dramas, including Only the Brave, The Texan, Seven Days' Leave, A Man from Wyoming, and The Spoilers (all released in 1930). Norman Rockwell depicted Cooper in his role as The Texan for the cover of The Saturday Evening Post on May 24, 1930.

One of the more important performances in Cooper's early career was his portrayal of a sullen legionnaire in Josef von Sternberg's film Morocco (also 1930) with Marlene Dietrich in her introduction to American audiences. During production, von Sternberg focused his energies on Dietrich and treated Cooper dismissively. Tensions came to a head after von Sternberg yelled directions at Cooper in German. The  actor approached the  director, picked him up by the collar, and said, "If you expect to work in this country, you'd better get on to the language we use here." Despite the tensions on the set, Cooper produced "one of his best performances", according to Thornton Delehanty of the New York Evening Post.

After returning to the Western genre in Zane Grey's Fighting Caravans (1931) with French actress Lili Damita, Cooper appeared in the Dashiell Hammett crime film City Streets (also 1931), co-starring Sylvia Sidney and Paul Lukas, playing a westerner who gets involved with big-city gangsters to save the woman he loves. Cooper concluded the year with appearances in two unsuccessful films: I Take This Woman (also 1931) with Carole Lombard, and His Woman with Claudette Colbert. The demands and pressures of making 10 films in two years left Cooper exhausted and in poor health, suffering from anemia and jaundice. He had lost  during that period, and felt lonely, isolated, and depressed by his sudden fame and wealth. In May 1931, Cooper left Hollywood and sailed to Algiers and then Italy, where he lived for the next year.

During his time abroad, Cooper stayed with the Countess Dorothy di Frasso at the Villa Madama in Rome, where she taught him about good food and vintage wines, how to read Italian and French menus, and how to socialize among Europe's nobility and upper classes. After guiding him through the great art museums and galleries of Italy, she accompanied him on a 10-week big-game hunting safari on the slopes of Mount Kenya in East Africa, where he was credited with more than 60 kills, including two lions, a rhinoceros, and various antelopes. His safari experience in Africa had a profound influence on Cooper and intensified his love of the wilderness. After returning to Europe, the countess and he set off on a Mediterranean cruise of the Italian and French Rivieras. Rested and rejuvenated by his year-long exile, a healthy Cooper returned to Hollywood in April 1932 and negotiated a new contract with Paramount for two films per year, a salary of $4,000 a week, and director and script approval.

In 1932, after completing Devil and the Deep with Tallulah Bankhead to fulfill his old contract, Cooper appeared in A Farewell to Arms, the first film adaptation of an Ernest Hemingway novel. Co-starring Helen Hayes, a leading New York theatre star and Academy Award winner, and Adolphe Menjou, the film presented Cooper with one of his most ambitious and challenging dramatic roles, playing an American ambulance driver wounded in Italy, who falls in love with an English nurse during World War I. Critics praised his highly intense and emotional performance, and the film became one of the year's most commercially successful pictures. In 1933, after making Today We Live with Joan Crawford and One Sunday Afternoon with Fay Wray, Cooper appeared in the Ernst Lubitsch comedy film Design for Living, based on the successful Noël Coward play. Co-starring Miriam Hopkins and Fredric March, the film was a box-office success, ranking as one of the top-10 highest-grossing films of 1933. All three of the lead actorsMarch, Cooper, and Hopkinsreceived attention from this film, as they were all at the peak of their careers. Cooper's performance, as an American artist in Europe competing with his playwright friend for the affections of a beautiful woman, was singled out for its versatility and revealed his genuine ability to do light comedy. Cooper changed his name legally to "Gary Cooper" in August 1933.

In 1934, Cooper was lent out to MGM for the Civil War drama film Operator 13 with Marion Davies, about a beautiful Union spy who falls in love with a Confederate soldier. Despite Richard Boleslawski's imaginative direction and George J. Folsey's lavish cinematography, the film did poorly at the box office.

Back at Paramount, Cooper appeared in his first of seven films by director Henry Hathaway, Now and Forever, with Carole Lombard and Shirley Temple. In the film, he plays a confidence man who tries to sell his daughter to the relatives who raised her, but is eventually won over by the adorable girl. Impressed by Temple's intelligence and charm, Cooper developed a close rapport with her, both on and off screen. The film was a box-office success.

The following year, Cooper was lent to Samuel Goldwyn Productions to appear in King Vidor's romance film The Wedding Night with Anna Sten, who was being groomed as "another Garbo". In the film, Cooper plays an alcoholic novelist who retreats to his family's New England farm, where he meets and falls in love with a beautiful Polish neighbor. Cooper delivered a performance of surprising range and depth, according to biographer Larry Swindell. Despite receiving generally favorable reviews, the film was not popular with American audiences, who may have been offended by the film's depiction of an extramarital affair and its tragic ending.

That same year, Cooper appeared in two Henry Hathaway films: the melodrama Peter Ibbetson with Ann Harding, about a man caught up in a dream world created by his love for a childhood sweetheart, and the adventure film The Lives of a Bengal Lancer, about a daring British officer and his men who defend their stronghold at Bengal against rebellious local tribes. While the former, championed by the surrealists became more successful in Europe than in the United States, the latter was nominated for seven Academy Awards and became one of Cooper's most popular and successful adventure films. Hathaway had the highest respect for Cooper's acting ability, calling him "the best actor of all of them".

American folk hero, 1936–1943

From Mr. Deeds to The Real Glory, 1936–1939

Cooper's career took an important turn in 1936. After making Frank Borzage's romantic comedy film Desire with Marlene Dietrich at Paramount, in which he delivered a performance considered by some contemporary critics as one of his finest, Cooper returned to Poverty Row for the first time since his early silent-film days to make Frank Capra's Mr. Deeds Goes to Town with Jean Arthur for Columbia Pictures. In the film, Cooper play Longfellow Deeds, a quiet, innocent writer of greeting cards who inherits a fortune, leaves behind his idyllic life in Vermont, and travels to New York City, where he faces a world of corruption and deceit. Capra and screenwriter Robert Riskin were able to use Cooper's well-established screen persona as the "quintessential American hero"a symbol of honesty, courage, and goodnessto create a new type of "folk hero" for the common man. Commenting on Cooper's impact on the character and the film, Capra observed:

Both Desire and Mr. Deeds opened in April 1936 to critical praise and were major box-office successes. In his review in The New York Times, Frank Nugent wrote that Cooper was "proving himself one of the best light comedians in Hollywood". For his performance in Mr. Deeds, Cooper received his first Academy Award nomination for Best Actor.

Cooper appeared in two other Paramount films in 1936. In Lewis Milestone's adventure film The General Died at Dawn with Madeleine Carroll, he plays an American soldier of fortune in China who helps the peasants defend themselves against the oppression of a cruel warlord. Written by playwright Clifford Odets, the film was a critical and commercial success.

In Cecil B. DeMille's sprawling frontier epic The Plainsman, his first of four films with the director, Cooper portrays Wild Bill Hickok in a highly fictionalized version of the opening of the American western frontier. The film was an even greater box-office hit than its predecessor, due in large part to Jean Arthur's definitive depiction of Calamity Jane and Cooper's inspired portrayal of Hickok as an enigmatic figure of "deepening mythic substance". That year, Cooper appeared for the first time on the Motion Picture Herald exhibitor's poll of top-10 film personalities, where he remained for the next 23 years.

In late 1936, Paramount was preparing a new contract for Cooper that would raise his salary to $8,000 a week, when Cooper signed a contract with Samuel Goldwyn for six films over six years with a minimum guarantee of $150,000 per picture. Paramount brought suit against Goldwyn and Cooper, and the court ruled that Cooper's new Goldwyn contract afforded the actor sufficient time to also honor his Paramount agreement. Cooper continued to make films with both studios, and by 1939, the United States Treasury reported that Cooper was the country's highest wage earner, at $482,819 (equivalent to $million in ).

In contrast to his output the previous year, Cooper appeared in only one picture in 1937, Henry Hathaway's adventure film Souls at Sea. A critical and box-office failure, Cooper referred to it as his "almost picture", saying, "It was almost exciting, and almost interesting. And I was almost good." In 1938, he appeared in Archie Mayo's biographical film The Adventures of Marco Polo. Plagued by production problems and a weak screenplay, the film became Goldwyn's biggest failure to date, losing $700,000. During this period, Cooper turned down several important roles, including the role of Rhett Butler in Gone with the Wind. Cooper was producer David O. Selznick's first choice for the part. He made several overtures to the actor, but Cooper had doubts about the project, and did not feel suited to the role. Cooper later admitted, "It was one of the best roles ever offered in Hollywood... But I said no. I didn't see myself as quite that dashing, and later, when I saw Clark Gable play the role to perfection, I knew I was right."

Back at Paramount, Cooper returned to a more comfortable genre in Ernst Lubitsch's romantic comedy Bluebeard's Eighth Wife (1938) with Claudette Colbert. In the film, Cooper plays a wealthy American businessman in France who falls in love with an impoverished aristocrat's daughter and persuades her to become his eighth wife. Despite the clever screenplay by Charles Brackett and Billy Wilder, and solid performances by Cooper and Colbert, American audiences had trouble accepting Cooper in the role of a shallow philanderer. It succeeded only at the European box-office market.

In the fall of 1938, Cooper appeared in H. C. Potter's romantic comedy The Cowboy and the Lady with Merle Oberon, about a sweet-natured rodeo cowboy who falls in love with the wealthy daughter of a presidential hopeful, believing her to be a poor, hard-working lady's maid. The efforts of three directors and several eminent screenwriters could not salvage what could have been a fine vehicle for Cooper. While more successful than its predecessor, the film was Cooper's fourth consecutive box-office failure in the American market.

In the next two years, Cooper was more discerning about the roles he accepted and made four successful large-scale adventure and cowboy films. In William A. Wellman's adventure film Beau Geste (1939), he plays one of three daring English brothers who join the French Foreign Legion in the Sahara to fight local tribes. Filmed in the same Mojave Desert locations as the original 1926 version with Ronald Colman, Beau Geste provided Cooper with magnificent sets, exotic settings, high-spirited action, and a role tailored to his personality and screen persona. This was the last film in Cooper's contract with Paramount.

In Henry Hathaway's The Real Glory (1939), he plays a military doctor who accompanies a small group of American Army officers to the Philippines to help the Christian Filipinos defend themselves against Muslim radicals. Many film critics praised Cooper's performance, including author and film critic Graham Greene, who recognized that he "never acted better".

From The Westerner to For Whom the Bell Tolls, 1940–1943
Cooper returned to the Western genre in William Wyler's The Westerner (1940) with Walter Brennan and Doris Davenport, about a drifting cowboy who defends homesteaders against Roy Bean, a corrupt judge known as the "law west of the Pecos". Screenwriter Niven Busch relied on Cooper's extensive knowledge of Western history while working on the script. The film received positive reviews and did well at the box office, with reviewers praising the performances of the two lead actors. That same year, Cooper appeared in his first all-Technicolor feature, Cecil B. DeMille's adventure film North West Mounted Police (1940). In the film, Cooper plays a Texas Ranger who pursues an outlaw into western Canada, where he joins forces with the Royal Canadian Mounted Police who are after the same man, a leader of the North-West Rebellion. While not as popular with critics as its predecessor, the film was another box-office success, the sixth-highest grossing film of 1940.

The early 1940s were Cooper's prime years as an actor. In a relatively short period, he appeared in five critically successful and popular films that produced some of his finest performances. When Frank Capra offered him the lead role in Meet John Doe before Robert Riskin even developed the script, Cooper accepted his friend's offer, saying, "It's okay, Frank, I don't need a script." In the film, Cooper plays Long John Willoughby, a down-and-out bush-league pitcher hired by a newspaper to pretend to be a man who promises to commit suicide on Christmas Eve to protest all the hypocrisy and corruption in the country. Considered by some critics to be Capra's best film at the time, Meet John Doe was received as a "national event" with Cooper appearing on the front cover of Time on March 3, 1941. In his review in the New York Herald Tribune, Howard Barnes called Cooper's performance a "splendid and utterly persuasive portrayal" and praised his "utterly realistic acting which comes through with such authority". Bosley Crowther, in The New York Times, wrote, "Gary Cooper, of course, is 'John Doe' to the life and in the wholeshy, bewildered, nonaggressive, but a veritable tiger when aroused."

That same year, Cooper made two films with director and good friend Howard Hawks. In the biographical film Sergeant York, Cooper portrays war hero Alvin C. York, one of the most decorated American soldiers in World WarI. The film chronicles York's early backwoods days in Tennessee, his religious conversion and subsequent piety, his stand as a conscientious objector, and finally his heroic actions at the Battle of the Argonne Forest, which earned him the Medal of Honor. Initially, Cooper was nervous and uncertain about playing a living hero, so he traveled to Tennessee to visit York at his home, and the two quiet men established an immediate rapport and discovered they had much in common. Inspired by York's encouragement, Cooper delivered a performance that Howard Barnes of the New York Herald Tribune called "one of extraordinary conviction and versatility", and that Archer Winston of the New York Post called "one of his best". After the film's release, Cooper was awarded the Distinguished Citizenship Medal by the Veterans of Foreign Wars for his "powerful contribution to the promotion of patriotism and loyalty". York admired Cooper's performance and helped promote the film for Warner Bros. Sergeant York became the top-grossing film of the year and was nominated for 11 Academy Awards. Accepting his first Academy Award for Best Actor from his friend James Stewart, Cooper said, "It was Sergeant Alvin York who won this award. Shucks, I've been in the business 16 years and sometimes dreamed I might get one of these. That's all I can say... Funny when I was dreaming I always made a better speech."

Cooper concluded the year back at Goldwyn with Howard Hawks to make the romantic comedy Ball of Fire with Barbara Stanwyck. In the film, Cooper plays a shy linguistics professor who leads a team of seven scholars who are writing an encyclopedia. While researching slang, he meets Stanwyck's flirtatious burlesque stripper Sugarpuss O'Shea who blows the dust off their staid life of books. The screenplay by Charles Brackett and Billy Wilder provided Cooper the opportunity to exercise the full range of his light comedy skills. In his review for the New York Herald Tribune, Howard Barnes wrote that Cooper handled the role with "great skill and comic emphasis" and that his performance was "utterly delightful". Though small in scale, Ball of Fire was one of the top-grossing films of the year and Cooper's fourth consecutive picture to make the top 20.

Cooper's only film appearance in 1942 was also his last under his Goldwyn contract. In Sam Wood's biographical film The Pride of the Yankees, Cooper portrays baseball star Lou Gehrig, who established a record with the New York Yankees for playing in 2,130 consecutive games. Cooper was reluctant to play the seven-time All-Star, who had died only the previous year from ALS (now commonly called "Lou Gehrig's disease"). Beyond the challenges of effectively portraying such a popular and nationally recognized figure, Cooper knew very little about baseball and was not left-handed like Gehrig.

After Gehrig's widow visited the actor and expressed her desire that he portray her husband, Cooper accepted the role that covered a 20-year span of Gehrig's lifehis early love of baseball, his rise to greatness, his loving marriage, and his struggle with illness, culminating in his farewell speech at Yankee Stadium on July 4, 1939, before 62,000 fans. Cooper quickly learned the physical movements of a baseball player and developed a fluid, believable swing. The handedness issue was solved by reversing the print for certain batting scenes. The film was one of the year's top-10 pictures and received 11 Academy Award nominations, including Best Picture and Best Actor (Cooper's third).

Soon after the publication of Ernest Hemingway's novel For Whom the Bell Tolls, Paramount paid $150,000 for the film rights with the express intent of casting Cooper in the lead role of Robert Jordan, an American explosives expert who fights alongside the Republican loyalists during the Spanish Civil War. The original director, Cecil B. DeMille, was replaced by Sam Wood, who brought in Dudley Nichols for the screenplay. After the start of principal photography in the Sierra Nevada in late 1942, Ingrid Bergman was brought in to replace ballerina Vera Zorina as the female leada change supported by Cooper and Hemingway. The love scenes between Bergman and Cooper were "rapturous" and passionate. Howard Barnes in the New York Herald Tribune wrote that both actors performed with "the true stature and authority of stars". While the film distorted the novel's original political themes and meaning, For Whom the Bell Tolls was a critical and commercial success and received 10 Academy Award nominations, including Best Picture and Best Actor (Cooper's fourth).

World War II related activities
Due to his age and health, Cooper did not serve in the military during World War II, but like many of his colleagues, he got involved in the war effort by entertaining the troops. In June 1943, he visited military hospitals in San Diego, and often appeared at the Hollywood Canteen serving food to the servicemen. In late 1943, Cooper undertook a  tour of the South West Pacific with actresses Una Merkel and Phyllis Brooks, and accordionist Andy Arcari.

Traveling on a B-24A Liberator bomber, the group toured the Cook Islands, Fiji, New Caledonia, Queensland, Brisbanewhere General Douglas MacArthur told Cooper he was watching Sergeant York in a Manila theater when Japanese bombs began fallingNew Guinea, Jayapura, and throughout the Solomon Islands.

The group often shared the same sparse living conditions and K-rations as the troops. Cooper met with the servicemen and women, visited military hospitals, introduced his attractive colleagues, and participated in occasional skits. The shows concluded with Cooper's moving recitation of Lou Gehrig's farewell speech. When he returned to the United States, he visited military hospitals throughout the country. Cooper later called his time with the troops the "greatest emotional experience" of his life.

Mature roles, 1944–1952

In 1944, Cooper appeared in Cecil B. DeMille's wartime adventure film The Story of Dr. Wassell with Laraine Dayhis third movie with the director. In the film, Cooper plays American doctor and missionary Corydon M. Wassell, who leads a group of wounded sailors through the jungles of Java to safety. Despite receiving poor reviews, Dr. Wassell was one of the top-grossing films of the year. With his Goldwyn and Paramount contracts now concluded, Cooper decided to remain independent and formed his own production company, International Pictures, with Leo Spitz, William Goetz, and Nunnally Johnson. The fledgling studio's first offering was Sam Wood's romantic comedy Casanova Brown with Teresa Wright, about a man who learns his soon-to-be ex-wife is pregnant with his child, just as he is about to marry another woman. The film received poor reviews, with the New York Daily News calling it "delightful nonsense", and Bosley Crowther, in The New York Times, criticizing Cooper's "somewhat obvious and ridiculous clowning". The film was barely profitable.

In 1945, Cooper starred in and produced Stuart Heisler's Western comedy Along Came Jones with Loretta Young for International. In this lighthearted parody of his past heroic image, Cooper plays comically inept cowboy Melody Jones, who is mistaken for a ruthless killer. Audiences embraced Cooper's character, and the film was one of the top box-office pictures of the yeara testament to Cooper's still vital audience appeal. It was also International's biggest financial success during its brief history before being sold off to Universal Studios in 1946.

Cooper's career during the postwar years drifted in new directions as American society was changing. While he still played conventional heroic roles, his films now relied less on his heroic screen persona and more on novel stories and exotic settings. In November 1945, Cooper appeared in Sam Wood's 19th-century period drama Saratoga Trunk with Ingrid Bergman, about a Texas cowboy and his relationship with a beautiful fortune hunter. Filmed in early 1943, the movie's release was delayed for two years due to the increased demand for war movies. Despite poor reviews, Saratoga Trunk did well at the box office and became one of the top moneymakers of the year for Warner Bros. Cooper's only film in 1946 was Fritz Lang's romantic thriller Cloak and Dagger, about a mild-mannered physics professor recruited by the Office of Strategic Services during the last years of World War II to investigate the German atomic-bomb program. Playing a part loosely based on physicist J. Robert Oppenheimer, Cooper was uneasy with the role and unable to convey the "inner sense" of the character. The film received poor reviews and was a box-office failure. In 1947, Cooper appeared in Cecil B. DeMille's epic adventure film Unconquered with Paulette Goddard, about a Virginia militiaman who defends settlers against an unscrupulous gun trader and hostile Indians on the Western frontier during the 18th century. The film received mixed reviews, but even long-time DeMille critic James Agee acknowledged the picture had "some authentic flavor of the period". This last of four films made with DeMille was Cooper's most lucrative, earning the actor over $300,000 (equal to $ today) in salary and percentage of profits. Unconquered was his last unqualified box-office success for the next five years.

In 1948, after making Leo McCarey's romantic comedy Good Sam, Cooper sold his company to Universal Studios and signed a long-term contract with Warner Bros. that gave him script and director approval and a guaranteed $295,000 (equal to $ today) per picture. His first film under the new contract was King Vidor's drama The Fountainhead (1949) with Patricia Neal and Raymond Massey. In the film, Cooper plays an idealistic and uncompromising architect who struggles to maintain his integrity and individualism in the face of societal pressures to conform to popular standards. Based on the novel by Ayn Rand, who also wrote the screenplay, the film reflects her philosophy and attacks the concepts of collectivism while promoting the virtues of individualism. For most critics, Cooper was hopelessly miscast in the role of Howard Roark. In his review for The New York Times, Bosley Crowther concluded he was "Mr. Deeds out of his element". Cooper returned to his element in Delmer Daves' war drama Task Force (1949), about a retiring rear admiral, who reminisces about his long career as a naval aviator and his role in the development of aircraft carriers. Cooper's performance and the Technicolor newsreel footage supplied by the United States Navy made the film one of Cooper's most popular during this period. In the next two years, Cooper made four poorly received films: Michael Curtiz' period drama Bright Leaf (1950), Stuart Heisler's Western melodrama Dallas (1950), Henry Hathaway's wartime comedy You're in the Navy Now (1951), and Raoul Walsh's Western action film Distant Drums (1951).

Cooper's most important film during the postwar years was Fred Zinnemann's Western drama High Noon (1952) with Grace Kelly and Katy Jurado for United Artists. In the film, Cooper plays retiring sheriff Will Kane, who is preparing to leave town on his honeymoon when he learns that an outlaw he helped put away and his three henchmen are returning to seek their revenge. Unable to gain the support of the frightened townspeople, and abandoned by his young bride, Kane nevertheless stays to face the outlaws alone. During the filming, Cooper was in poor health and in considerable pain from stomach ulcers. His ravaged face and discomfort in some scenes "photographed as self-doubt", according to biographer Hector Arce, and contributed to the effectiveness of his performance. Considered one of the first "adult" Westerns for its theme of moral courage, High Noon received enthusiastic reviews for its artistry, with Time  placing it in the ranks of Stagecoach and The Gunfighter. Bosley Crowther, in The New York Times, wrote that Cooper was "at the top of his form", and John McCarten, in The New Yorker, wrote that Cooper was never more effective. The film earned $3.75million in the United States and $18million worldwide. Following the example of his friend James Stewart, Cooper accepted a lower salary in exchange for a percentage of the profits, and ended up making $600,000. Cooper's understated performance was widely praised, and earned him his second Academy Award for Best Actor.

Later films, 1953–1959

After appearing in André de Toth's Civil War drama Springfield Rifle (1952)a standard Warner Bros. film that was overshadowed by the success of its predecessorCooper made four films outside the United States. In Mark Robson's drama Return to Paradise (1953), Cooper plays an American wanderer who liberates the inhabitants of a Polynesian island from the puritanical rule of a misguided pastor. Cooper endured spartan living conditions, long hours, and ill health during the three-month location shoot on the island of Upolu in Western Samoa. Despite its beautiful cinematography, the film received poor reviews. Cooper's next three films were shot in Mexico. In Hugo Fregonese's action adventure film Blowing Wild (1953) with Barbara Stanwyck, he plays a wildcatter in Mexico, who gets involved with an oil-company executive and his unscrupulous wife with whom he once had an affair.

In 1954, Cooper appeared in Henry Hathaway's Western drama Garden of Evil, with Susan Hayward, about three soldiers of fortune in Mexico hired to rescue a woman's husband. That same year, he appeared in Robert Aldrich's Western adventure Vera Cruz with Burt Lancaster. In the film, Cooper plays an American adventurer hired by Emperor MaximilianI to escort a countess to Vera Cruz during the Mexican Rebellion of 1866. All these films received poor reviews, but did well at the box office. For his work in Vera Cruz, Cooper earned $1.4million in salary and a percentage of the gross.

During this period, Cooper struggled with health problems. He suffered a severe shoulder injury during the filming of Blowing Wild when he was hit by metal fragments from a dynamited oil well, as well as his ongoing treatment for ulcers. During the filming of Vera Cruz, he reinjured his hip by falling from a horse, and was burned when Lancaster fired his rifle too close and the wadding from the blank shell pierced his clothing.

Cooper appeared in Otto Preminger's 1955 biographical war drama The Court-Martial of Billy Mitchell, about the World WarI general who tried to convince government officials of the importance of air power, and was court-martialed after blaming the War Department for a series of air disasters. Some critics felt Cooper was miscast, and that his dull, tight-lipped performance did not reflect Mitchell's dynamic and caustic personality. In 1956, Cooper was more effective playing a gentle Indiana Quaker in William Wyler's Civil War drama Friendly Persuasion with Dorothy McGuire. Like Sergeant York and High Noon, the film addresses the conflict between religious pacifism and civic duty. For his performance, Cooper received his second Golden Globe nomination for Best Motion Picture Actor. The film was nominated for six Academy Awards, was awarded the Palme d'Or at the 1957 Cannes Film Festival, and went on to earn $8million worldwide.

Cooper traveled to France in 1956 to make Billy Wilder's romantic comedy Love in the Afternoon with Audrey Hepburn and Maurice Chevalier. In the film, Cooper plays a middle-aged American playboy in Paris who pursues and eventually falls in love with a much younger woman. Despite receiving some positive reviews, including from Bosley Crowther, who praised the film's "charming performances", most reviewers concluded that Cooper was simply too old for the part. While audiences may not have welcomed seeing Cooper's heroic screen image tarnished by his playing an aging roué trying to seduce an innocent young girl, the film was still a box-office success. The following year, Cooper appeared in Philip Dunne's romantic drama Ten North Frederick. In the film, which was based on the novel by John O'Hara, Cooper plays an attorney whose life is ruined by a double-crossing politician and his own secret affair with his daughter's young roommate. While Cooper brought "conviction and controlled anguish" to his performance, according to biographer Jeffrey Meyers, it was not enough to save what Bosley Crowther called a "hapless film".

Despite his ongoing health problems and several operations for ulcers and hernias, Cooper continued to work in action films. In 1958, he appeared in Anthony Mann's Western drama Man of the West (1958) with Julie London and Lee J. Cobb, about a reformed outlaw and killer who is forced to confront his violent past when the train in which he is riding is held up by his former gang members. The film has been called Cooper's "most pathological Western", with its themes of impotent rage, sexual humiliation, and sadism. According to biographer Jeffrey Meyers, Cooper, who struggled with moral conflicts in his personal life, "understood the anguish of a character striving to retain his integrity... [and] brought authentic feeling to the role of a tempted and tormented, yet essentially decent man". Mostly ignored by critics at the time, the film is now well-regarded by film scholars and is considered Cooper's last great film.

After his Warner Bros. contract ended, Cooper formed his own production company, Baroda Productions, and made three unusual films in 1959 about redemption. In Delmer Daves' Western drama The Hanging Tree, Cooper plays a frontier doctor who saves a criminal from a lynch mob, and later tries to exploit his sordid past. Cooper delivered a "powerful and persuasive" performance of an emotionally scarred man whose need to dominate others is transformed by the love and sacrifice of a woman. In Robert Rossen's historical adventure They Came to Cordura with Rita Hayworth, he plays an army officer who is found guilty of cowardice and assigned the degrading task of recommending soldiers for the Medal of Honor during the Pancho Villa Expedition of 1916.

While Cooper received positive reviews, Variety and Films in Review felt he was too old for the part. In Michael Anderson's action drama The Wreck of the Mary Deare with Charlton Heston, Cooper plays a disgraced merchant-marine officer who decides to stay aboard his sinking cargo ship to prove the vessel was deliberately scuttled and to redeem his good name. Like its two predecessors, the film was physically demanding. Cooper, who was a trained scuba diver, did most of his own underwater scenes. Biographer Jeffrey Meyers observed that in all three roles Cooper effectively conveyed the sense of lost honor and desire for redemptionwhat Joseph Conrad in Lord Jim called the "struggles of an individual trying to save from the fire his idea of what his moral identity should be".

Personal life

Marriage and family

Cooper was formally introduced to his future wife, 20-year-old New York debutante Veronica Balfe, on Easter Sunday 1933 at a party given by her uncle, art director Cedric Gibbons. Called "Rocky" by her family and friends, she grew up on Park Avenue and attended finishing schools. Her stepfather was Wall Street tycoon Paul Shields. Cooper and Rocky were quietly married at her parents' Park Avenue residence on December 15, 1933. According to his friends, the marriage had a positive impact on Cooper, who turned away from past indiscretions and took control of his life. Athletic and a lover of the outdoors, Rocky shared many of Cooper's interests, including riding, skiing, and skeet-shooting. She organized their social life, and her wealth and social connections provided Cooper access to New York high society. Cooper and his wife owned homes in the Los Angeles area in Encino (1933–36), Brentwood (1936–53), and Holmby Hills (1954–61), and owned a vacation home in Aspen, Colorado (1949–53).

Gary and Veronica Cooper's daughter, Maria Veronica Cooper, was born on September 15, 1937. By all accounts, he was a patient and affectionate father, teaching Maria to ride a bicycle, play tennis, ski, and ride horses. Sharing many of her parents' interests, she accompanied them on their travels and was often photographed with them. Like her father, she developed a love for art and drawing. As a family, they vacationed together in Sun Valley, Idaho, spent time at Rocky's parents' country house in Southampton, New York, and took frequent trips to Europe. Cooper and Rocky were legally separated on May 16, 1951, when Cooper moved out of their home. For over two years, they maintained a fragile and uneasy family life with their daughter. Cooper moved back into their home in November 1953, and their formal reconciliation occurred in February 1954.

Romantic relationships

Prior to his marriage, Cooper had a series of romantic relationships with leading actresses, beginning in 1927 with Clara Bow, who advanced his career by helping him get one of his first leading roles in Children of Divorce. Bow was also responsible for getting Cooper a role in Wings, which generated an enormous amount of fan mail for the young actor. In 1928, he had a relationship with another experienced actress, Evelyn Brent, whom he met while filming Beau Sabreur. In 1929, while filming The Wolf Song, Cooper began an intense affair with Lupe Vélez, which was the most important romance of his early life. During their two years together, Cooper also had brief affairs with Marlene Dietrich while filming Morocco in 1930 and with Carole Lombard while making I Take This Woman in 1931. During his year abroad in 1931–32, Cooper had an affair with the married Countess Dorothy di Frasso, while staying at her Villa Madama near Rome.

After he was married in December 1933, Cooper remained faithful to his wife until the summer of 1942, when he began an affair with Ingrid Bergman during the production of For Whom the Bell Tolls. Their relationship lasted through the completion of filming Saratoga Trunk in June 1943. In 1948, after finishing work on The Fountainhead, Cooper began an affair with Patricia Neal, his co-star. At first, they kept their affair discreet, but eventually it became an open secret in Hollywood, and Cooper's wife confronted him with the rumors, which he admitted were true. He also confessed that he was in love with Neal, and continued to see her. Cooper and his wife were legally separated in May 1951, but he did not seek a divorce. Neal later claimed that Cooper hit her after she went on a date with Kirk Douglas, and that he arranged for her to have an abortion when she became pregnant with Cooper's child. Neal ended their relationship in late December 1951. During his three-year separation from his wife, Cooper was rumored to have had affairs with Grace Kelly, Lorraine Chanel, and Gisèle Pascal.

Cooper biographers have explored his friendship in the late '20s with the actor Anderson Lawler, with whom Cooper shared a house on and off for a year, while at the same time seeing Clara Bow, Evelyn Brent, and Lupe Vélez. Lupe Vélez once told Hedda Hopper of Vélez' affair with Cooper; whenever he would come home after seeing Lawler, she would sniff for Lawler's cologne. Vélez' biographer Michelle Vogel has reported that Vélez consented to Cooper's sexual behavior with Lawler, but only as long as she, too, could participate. In later life, he became involved with costume designer Irene, and was, according to her, "the only man she ever loved". A year after his death in 1961, Irene committed suicide by jumping from the 11th floor of the Knickerbocker Hotel, after telling Doris Day of her grief over Cooper's death.

Friendships, interests, and character
According to Cooper

Cooper's 20-year friendship with Ernest Hemingway began at Sun Valley in October 1940. The previous year, Hemingway drew upon Cooper's image when he created the character of Robert Jordan for the novel For Whom the Bell Tolls. The two shared a passion for the outdoors, and for years they hunted duck and pheasant, and skied together in Sun Valley. Both men admired the work of Rudyard Kipling; Cooper kept a copy of the poem "If—" in his dressing room, and retained as adults Kipling's sense of boyish adventure.

As well as admiring Cooper's hunting skills and knowledge of the outdoors, Hemingway believed his character matched his screen persona, once telling a friend, "If you made up a character like Coop, nobody would believe it. He's just too good to be true." They saw each other often, and their friendship remained strong through the years.

Cooper's social life generally centered on sports, outdoor activities, and dinner parties with his family and friends from the film industry, including directors Henry Hathaway, Howard Hawks, William Wellman, and Fred Zinnemann, and actors Joel McCrea, James Stewart, Barbara Stanwyck, and Robert Taylor.  Cooper, in addition to hunting, enjoyed riding, fishing, skiing, and later in life, scuba diving. He never abandoned his early love for art and drawing, and over the years, he and his wife acquired a private collection of modern paintings, including works by Pierre-Auguste Renoir, Paul Gauguin, and Georgia O'Keeffe. Cooper owned several works by Pablo Picasso, whom he met in 1956. Cooper also had a lifelong passion for automobiles, with a collection that included a 1930 Duesenberg.

Cooper was naturally reserved and introspective, and loved the solitude of outdoor activities. Not unlike his screen persona, his communication style frequently consisted of long silences with an occasional "yup" and "shucks". He once said, "If others have more interesting things to say than I have, I keep quiet." According to his friends, Cooper could also be an articulate, well-informed conversationalist on topics ranging from horses, guns, and Western history to film production, sports cars, and modern art. He was modest and unpretentious, frequently downplaying his acting abilities and career accomplishments. His friends and colleagues described him as charming, well-mannered, and thoughtful, with a lively, boyish sense of humor. Cooper maintained a sense of propriety throughout his career and never misused his movie-star status; he never sought special treatment or refused to work with a director or leading lady. His close friend Joel McCrea recalled, "Coop never fought, he never got mad, he never told anybody off that I know of; everybody [who] worked with him liked him."

Political views
Like his father, Cooper was a conservative Republican; he voted for Calvin Coolidge in 1924 and Herbert Hoover in 1928 and 1932, and campaigned for Wendell Willkie in 1940. When Franklin D. Roosevelt ran for an unprecedented fourth presidential term in 1944, Cooper campaigned for Thomas E. Dewey and criticized Roosevelt for being dishonest and adopting "foreign" ideas. In a radio address he had paid for himself just before the election, Cooper said, "I disagree with the New Deal belief that the America all of us love is old and worn-out and finishedand has to borrow foreign notions that don't even seem to work any too well where they come from... Our country is a young country that just has to make up its mind to be itself again." He also attended a Republican rally at the Los Angeles Memorial Coliseum that drew 93,000 Dewey supporters. In 1952, Cooper, along with John Wayne, Adolphe Menjou and Glenn Ford, supported Robert A. Taft over Dwight D. Eisenhower in the Republican primaries.

Cooper was one of the founding members of the Motion Picture Alliance for the Preservation of American Ideals, a conservative organization dedicated, according to its statement of principles, to preserving the "American way of life" and opposing communism and fascism. The organization (members included Walter Brennan, Laraine Day, Walt Disney, Clark Gable, Hedda Hopper, Ronald Reagan, Barbara Stanwyck, and John Wayne) advised the United States Congress to investigate communist influence in the motion-picture industry. On October 23, 1947, Cooper was subpoenaed to appear before the House Un-American Activities Committee (HUAC) and was asked if he had observed any "communistic influence" in Hollywood.

Cooper recounted statements he had heard suggesting the Constitution was out of date and that Congress was an unnecessary institution, comments which Cooper said he found to be "very un-American", and testified that he had rejected several scripts because he thought they were "tinged with communist ideas". Unlike some other witnesses, Cooper did not name any individuals or scripts.

In 1951, while making High Noon, Cooper befriended the film's screenwriter, Carl Foreman, who had been a member of the Communist Party. When Foreman was subpoenaed by the HUAC, Cooper put his career on the line to defend Foreman. When John Wayne and others threatened Cooper with blacklisting himself and the loss of his passport if he did not walk off the film, Cooper gave a statement to the press in support of Foreman, calling him "the finest kind of American". When producer Stanley Kramer removed Foreman's name as screenwriter, Cooper and director Fred Zinnemann threatened to walk off the film if Foreman's name were not restored. Foreman later said that of all his friends and allies and colleagues in Hollywood, "Cooper was the only big one who tried to help. The only one." Cooper even offered to testify in Foreman's behalf before the committee, but character witnesses were not allowed. Foreman always sent future scripts to Cooper for first refusal, including The Bridge on the River Kwai, The Key, and The Guns of Navarone. Cooper had to turn them down because of his age.

Religion
Cooper was baptized in the Church of All Saints, Houghton Regis, in Bedfordshire, England, in December 1911, and was raised in the Episcopal Church in the United States. While he was not an observant Christian for most of his adult life, many of his friends believed he had a deeply spiritual side.

On June 26, 1953, Cooper accompanied his wife and daughter, who were devout Catholics, to Rome, where they had an audience with Pope Pius XII. Cooper and his wife were still separated at the time, but the papal visit marked the beginning of their gradual reconciliation. In the following years, Cooper contemplated his mortality and his personal behavior, and started discussing Catholicism with his family. He began attending church with them regularly, and met with their parish priest, who offered Cooper spiritual guidance. After several months of study, Cooper was baptized as a Catholic on April 9, 1959, before a small group of family and friends at the Church of the Good Shepherd in Beverly Hills.

Final years and death

On April 14, 1960, Cooper underwent surgery at Massachusetts General Hospital in Boston for an aggressive form of prostate cancer that had metastasized to his colon. He fell ill again on May 31 and underwent further surgery at Lebanon Hospital in Los Angeles in early June to remove a malignant tumor from his large intestine. After recuperating over the summer, Cooper took his family on vacation to the south of France before traveling to the UK in the fall to star in The Naked Edge. In December 1960, he worked on the NBC television documentary The Real West, which was part of the company's Project 20 series.

On December 27, his wife learned from their family doctor that Cooper's cancer had spread to his lungs and bones and was inoperable. His family decided not to tell him immediately.

On January 9, 1961, Cooper attended a dinner given in his honor and hosted by Frank Sinatra and Dean Martin at the Friars Club. The dinner was attended by many of his industry friends and concluded with a brief speech by Cooper, who said, "The only achievement I'm proud of is the friends I've made in this community."

In mid-January, Cooper took his family to Sun Valley for their last vacation together. Cooper and Hemingway hiked through the snow together for the last time. On February 27, after returning to Los Angeles, Cooper learned that he was dying. He later told his family, "We'll pray for a miracle; but if not, and that's God's will, that's all right, too." On April 17, Cooper watched the Academy Awards ceremony on television and saw his good friend James Stewart, who had presented Cooper with his first Oscar years earlier, accept on Cooper's behalf an honorary award for lifetime achievementhis third Oscar. Holding back tears, Stewart said, "Coop, I'll get this to you right away. And Coop, I want you to know this, that with this goes all the warm friendship and the affection and the admiration and the deep, the deep respect of all of us. We're very, very proud of you, Coop. All of us are tremendously proud." The following day, newspapers around the world announced that Cooper was dying. In the coming days, he received numerous messages of appreciation and encouragement, including telegrams from Pope John XXIII and Queen Elizabeth II, and a telephone call from President John F. Kennedy.

In his last public statement on May 4, 1961, Cooper said, "I know that what is happening is God's will. I am not afraid of the future." He received the last rites on Friday, May 12, and died quietly the next day.

A requiem was held on May 18 at the Church of the Good Shepherd, attended by many of Cooper's friends, including James Stewart, Jack Benny, Henry Hathaway, Joel McCrea, Audrey Hepburn, Jack L. Warner, John Ford, John Wayne, Edward G. Robinson, Frank Sinatra, Dean Martin, Fred Astaire, Randolph Scott, Walter Pidgeon, Bob Hope, and Marlene Dietrich. Cooper was buried in the Grotto of Our Lady of Lourdes in Holy Cross Cemetery in Culver City, California. In May 1974, after his family relocated to New York, Cooper's remains were exhumed and reburied in Sacred Hearts Cemetery in Southampton. His grave is marked by a three-ton boulder from a Montauk quarry.

Acting style and reputation

Cooper's acting style consisted of three essential characteristics - his ability to project elements of his own personality onto the characters he portrayed, to appear natural and authentic in his roles, and to underplay and deliver restrained performances calibrated for the camera and the screen. Acting teacher Lee Strasberg once observed: "The simplest examples of Stanislavsky's ideas are actors such as Gary Cooper, John Wayne, and Spencer Tracy. They try not to act, but to be themselves, to respond or react. They refuse to say or do anything they feel not to be consonant with their own characters." Film director François Truffaut ranked Cooper among "the greatest actors" because of his ability to deliver great performances "without direction". This ability to project elements of his own personality onto his characters produced a continuity across his performances to the extent that critics and audiences were convinced he was simply "playing himself".

Cooper's ability to project his personality onto his characters played an important part in his appearing natural and authentic on screen. Actor John Barrymore said of Cooper, "This fellow is the world's greatest actor. He does without effort what the rest of us spend our lives trying to learnnamely, to be natural." Charles Laughton, who played opposite Cooper in Devil and the Deep agreed, "In truth, that boy hasn't the least idea how well he acts... He gets at it from the inside, from his own clear way of looking at life." William Wyler, who directed Cooper in two films, called him a "superb actor, a master of movie acting".

In his review of Cooper's performance in The Real Glory, Graham Greene wrote, "Sometimes his lean photogenic face seems to leave everything to the lens, but there is no question here of his not acting. Watch him inoculate the girl against cholerathe casual jab of the needle, and the dressing slapped on while he talks, as though a thousand arms had taught him where to stab and he doesn't have to think anymore."

Cooper's style of underplaying before the camera surprised many of his directors and fellow actors. Even in his earliest feature films, he recognized the camera's ability to pick up slight gestures and facial movements. Commenting on Cooper's performance in Sergeant York, director Howard Hawks observed, "He worked very hard and yet he didn't seem to be working. He was a strange actor because you'd look at him during a scene and you'd think... this isn't going to be any good. But when you saw the rushes in the projection room the next day you could read in his face all the things he'd been thinking." Sam Wood, who directed Cooper in four films, had similar observations about Cooper's performance in Pride of the Yankees, noting, "What I thought was underplaying turned out to be just the right approach. On the screen he's perfect, yet on the set you'd swear it's the worst job of acting in the history of motion pictures."

Fellow actors admired his abilities as an actor. Commenting on her two films playing opposite Cooper, actress Ingrid Bergman concluded, "The personality of this man was so enormous, so overpoweringand that expression in his eyes and his face, it was so delicate and so underplayed. You just didn't notice it until you saw it on the screen. I thought he was marvelous; the most underplaying and the most natural actor I ever worked with."

Tom Hanks declared, "In only one scene in the first film to win the Academy Award for Best Picture, we see the future of screen acting in the form of Gary Cooper. He is quiet and natural, somehow different from the other cast members. He does something mysterious with his eyes and shoulders that is much more like 'being' than 'acting'."

Daniel Day-Lewis said, "I don't particularly like westerns as a genre, but I do love certain westerns. 'High Noon' means a lot to meI love the purity and the honesty, I love Gary Cooper in that film, the idea of the last man standing."

Chris Pratt stated, "I started watching Westerns when I was shooting in London about four or five years ago. I really fell in love with Gary Cooper, and his stuff. That sucked me into the Westerns. Before, I never got engrossed in the story. I'd just dip in, and there were guys in horses in black and white. High Noon's later Gary Cooper, I liked that. But I liked 'The Westerner'. That's my favorite one. I have that poster hung up in my house because I really like that one."

To Al Pacino, "Gary Cooper was a phenomenonhis ability to take some thing and elevate it, give it such dignity. One of the great presences."

Mylène Demongeot first got with Gary Cooper for the opening of the first escalator to be installed in a cinema, at the Rex Theatre in Paris, on June 7, 1957. She declared in a 2015 filmed interview: "Gary Cooper... il est sublime ! Aaahhh (Mylène pushing a cry of love not to say ecstasy) il est sublime... Ah ! Ah ! Ah ! Là je dois dire que ça fait partie des stars, y'a Gary Cooper, Cary Grant, John Wayne, ces grands Américains que j'ai rencontrés comme ça, c'est vraiment des mecs incroyables. Y'en a plus des comme ça ! Euh non. (Gary Cooper was sublime, there I have to say, now he, was part of the stars, Gary Cooper, Cary Grant, John Wayne, those great americans who I've met really were unbelievable guys, there aren't any like them anymore)."

Career assessment and legacy

Cooper's career spanned thirty-six years, from 1925 to 1961. During that time he appeared in eighty-four feature films in a leading role. He was a major movie star from the end of the silent film era to the end of the golden age of Classical Hollywood. His natural and authentic acting style appealed powerfully to both men and women, and his range of performances included roles in most major movie genres, including Westerns, war films, adventure films, drama films, crime films, romance films, comedy films, and romantic comedy films. He appeared on the Motion Picture Herald exhibitor's poll of top ten film personalities for twenty-three consecutive years, from 1936 to 1958. According to Quigley's annual poll, Cooper was one of the top money-making stars for eighteen years, appearing in the top ten in 1936–37, 1941–49, and 1951–57. He topped the list in 1953. In Quigley's list of all-time money-making stars, Cooper is listed fourth, after John Wayne, Clint Eastwood, and Tom Cruise. At the time of his death, it was estimated that his films grossed well over $200million (equivalent to $billion in ).

In more than half his feature films, Cooper portrayed Westerners, soldiers, pilots, sailors, and explorers, all men of action. In the rest, he played a wide range of characters, included doctors, professors, artists, architects, clerks, and baseball players. Cooper's heroic screen image changed with each period of his career. In his early films, he played the young naive hero sure of his moral position and trusting in the triumph of simple virtues (The Virginian). After becoming a major star, his Western screen persona was replaced by a more cautious hero in adventure films and dramas (A Farewell to Arms). During the height of his career, from 1936 to 1943, he played a new type of hero: a champion of the common man willing to sacrifice himself for others (Mr. Deeds, Meet John Doe, and For Whom the Bell Tolls).

In the postwar years, Cooper attempted broader variations on his screen image, which now reflected a hero increasingly at odds with the world, who must face adversity alone (The Fountainhead and High Noon). In his final films, Cooper's hero rejects the violence of the past, and seeks to reclaim lost honor and find redemption (Friendly Persuasion and Man of the West). The screen persona he developed and sustained throughout his career represented the ideal American heroa tall, handsome, and sincere man of steadfast integrity who emphasized action over intellect, and combined the heroic qualities of the romantic lover, the adventurer, and the common man.

On February 6, 1960, Cooper was awarded a star on the Hollywood Walk of Fame at 6243 Hollywood Boulevard for his contribution to the film industry. He was awarded a star on the sidewalk outside the Ellen Theater in Bozeman, Montana.

On May 6, 1961, Cooper was awarded the French Order of Arts and Letters in recognition of his significant contribution to the arts. On July 30, 1961, he was posthumously awarded the David di Donatello Special Award in Italy for his career achievements.

In 1966, Cooper was inducted into the Hall of Great Western Performers at the National Cowboy & Western Heritage Museum in Oklahoma City. In 2015, he was inducted into the Utah Cowboy and Western Heritage Hall of Fame. The American Film Institute (AFI) ranked Cooper 11th on its list of the 25 male stars of classic Hollywood. Three of his charactersWill Kane, Lou Gehrig, and Sergeant Yorkmade AFI's list of the 100 greatest heroes and villains, all of them as heroes. His Lou Gehrig line, "Today, I consider myself the luckiest man on the face of the earth.", is ranked by AFI as the 38th greatest movie quote of all time.

More than half a century after his death, Cooper's enduring legacy, according to biographer Jeffrey Meyers, is his image of the ideal American hero preserved in his film performances. Charlton Heston once observed, "He projected the kind of man Americans would like to be, probably more than any actor that's ever lived."

In the TV series Justified, based on works and characters created by Elmore Leonard, Gary Cooper is used throughout the six seasons as the man whom U.S. Marshal Raylan Givens, played by Timothy Olyphant, aspires to be. When his colleague asks Marshal Givens how he thinks his dangerous plan to bring down a villain can possibly work, he replies: "Why not? Worked for Gary Cooper."

Gary Cooper is referenced several times in the critically acclaimed television series The Sopranos, with protagonist Tony Soprano asking, "What ever happened to Gary Cooper? The strong, silent type..." while complaining about his problems to his therapist.

In the 1930s hit song "Puttin' On the Ritz", Cooper is referenced in the line "dress up like a million-dollar trooper/Tryin' hard to look like Gary Cooper, Super duper!" More than two decades after Cooper's death, a new version of the song was released in 1983 by Taco; the original lyrics were kept, including the references to Cooper.

In J. D. Salinger's The Catcher in the Rye, chapter 10, Cooper is "spotted" by Holden Caulfield to distract a woman with whom he is dancing.

Patricia Neal named the Abbey of Regina Laudis' outdoor theater building The Gary-The Olivia in honor of Cooper and her daughter Olivia Dahl.

Awards and nominations

Filmography

The following is a list of feature films in which Cooper appeared in a leading role.

The Winning of Barbara Worth (1926)
Children of Divorce (1927)
Arizona Bound (1927)
Wings (1927)
Nevada (1927)
It (1927)
The Last Outlaw (1927)
Beau Sabreur (1928)
The Legion of the Condemned (1928)
Doomsday (1928)
Half a Bride (1928)
Lilac Time (1928)
The First Kiss (1928)
The Shopworn Angel (1928)
Wolf Song (1929)
Betrayal (1929)
The Virginian (1929)
Only the Brave (1930)
The Texan (1930)
Seven Days' Leave (1930)
A Man from Wyoming (1930)
The Spoilers (1930)
Morocco (1930)
Fighting Caravans (1931)
City Streets (1931)
I Take This Woman (1931)
His Woman (1931)
Devil and the Deep (1932)
If I Had a Million (1932)
A Farewell to Arms (1932)
Today We Live (1933)
One Sunday Afternoon (1933)
Design for Living (1933)
Alice in Wonderland (1933)
Operator 13 (1934)
Now and Forever (1934)
The Lives of a Bengal Lancer (1935)
The Wedding Night (1935)
Peter Ibbetson (1935)
Desire (1936)
Mr. Deeds Goes to Town (1936)
The General Died at Dawn (1936)
The Plainsman (1936)
Souls at Sea (1937)
The Adventures of Marco Polo (1938)
Bluebeard's Eighth Wife (1938)
The Cowboy and the Lady (1938)
Beau Geste (1939)
The Real Glory (1939)
The Westerner (1940)
North West Mounted Police (1940)
Meet John Doe (1941)
Sergeant York (1941)
Ball of Fire (1941)
The Pride of the Yankees (1942)
For Whom the Bell Tolls (1943)
The Story of Dr. Wassell (1944)
Casanova Brown (1944)
Along Came Jones (1945)
Saratoga Trunk (1945)
Cloak and Dagger (1946)
Unconquered (1947)
Good Sam (1948)
The Fountainhead (1949)
Task Force (1949)
Bright Leaf (1950)
Dallas (1950)
You're in the Navy Now (1951)
It's a Big Country (1951)
Distant Drums (1951)
High Noon (1952)
Springfield Rifle (1952)
Return to Paradise (1953)
Blowing Wild (1953)
Garden of Evil (1954)
Vera Cruz (1954)
The Court-Martial of Billy Mitchell (1955)
Friendly Persuasion (1956)
Love in the Afternoon (1957)
Ten North Frederick (1958)
Man of the West (1958)
The Hanging Tree (1959)
They Came to Cordura (1959)
The Wreck of the Mary Deare (1959)
The Naked Edge (1961)

Radio appearances

Notes

References

Bibliography

Adrien Le Bihan, Gary Cooper, le prince des acteurs, LettMotif, 2021, 358p.()

External links

1901 births
1961 deaths
20th-century American male actors
Academy Honorary Award recipients
American expatriates in England
American male film actors
American male silent film actors
American male television actors
American people of English descent
Best Actor Academy Award winners
Best Drama Actor Golden Globe (film) winners
California Republicans
Catholics from Montana
Conservatism in the United States
Converts to Roman Catholicism from Anglicanism
Deaths from cancer in California
Deaths from prostate cancer
Grinnell College people
Male Western (genre) film actors
Male actors from Montana
Paramount Pictures contract players
People educated at Dunstable Grammar School
People from Brentwood, Los Angeles
People from Dunstable
People from Helena, Montana
People from Holmby Hills, Los Angeles